Resolution is the seventh studio album by American heavy metal band Lamb of God. It is available on a single disc CD or a two-disc deluxe edition.

Information
The album was produced and mixed by Josh Wilbur as was the previous album. The main difference with previous records is that its writing process started before they ended touring on Wrath, and started in hotel rooms on a laptop.

Besides the normal edition a two disc was available in the UK to pre-order for a limited time, containing a bonus 12-track live album entitled "Wrath – Tour 2009/2010," which was only available through Amazon.co.uk, Play.com and HMV. The lead single, entitled "Ghost Walking", was released on December 5, 2011. The album debuted at number 3 on the Billboard 200 and number 1 on the Rock Chart.  The album sold around 52,000 copies in the U.S. during the first week of release.  The album has sold 161,000 copies in the US as of June 2015.

The iTunes edition comes with two bonus tracks, the first is an exclusive track titled "Digital Sands" and the second is a live version of the song "Vigil" originally from the album As the Palaces Burn.

The Japanese edition also comes with an exclusive track "Bury Me Under the Sun".

Reception
Resolution received mostly positive reviews.  On Metacritic, the album attained an overall score of 72 out of 100, based on 18 reviews from professional critics.  Rick Florino of Artistdirect gave the album 5 out of 5 stars stating that it was "Lamb of God at their finest." Carla Gillis of Now Magazine gave it three out of five stars and said, "Resolution is as aggressive as ever, no mean feat for a band seven albums in, and rife with memorable riffs ("Desolation," "The Undertow," "Barbarosa"). There are new proggier and acoustic bits ("Ghost Walking") on display."

Track listing

Credits 
Writing, performance and production credits are adapted from the album liner notes.

Personnel

Lamb of God 
 Randy Blythe – vocals
 Mark Morton – lead guitar
 Willie Adler – rhythm guitar
 John Campbell – bass
 Chris Adler – drums

Additional musicians 
 Amanda Munton – vocals on "King Me"
 Bryan Crook – orchestration on "King Me"

Production 
 Josh Wilbur – production, engineering, mixing
 Paul Suarez – engineering
 UE Nastasi – mastering

Artwork and design 
 Ken Adams – art direction
 Dustin Couch – photography
 Brian Feeley – photography

Studios 
 Spin Recording Studios, New York City, NY, USA – recording
 Studio Barbarosa, Port Hayward, VA, USA – recording
 New England School of Communications, Bangor, ME, USA – recording (Munton's vocals)
 , New York City, NY, USA – mastering

Charts

Weekly charts

Year-end charts

References

External links 
 
 Resolution at Roadrunner Records UK

2012 albums
Epic Records albums
Lamb of God (band) albums
Roadrunner Records albums